Hurles Scales Jr. is a former American professional football defensive back in the National Football League (NFL).

Scales was born in Amarillo, Texas, the son of Hurles and Frankie Mae Scales.

College career
He played college football at the University of North Texas. He earned a bachelor of science degree in Industrial Arts from UNT as well as a master's degree in Education.  He is member of Kappa Alpha Psi fraternity.

NFL career
He was drafted in the 14th round (355th overall) of the 1973 NFL Draft by the Cincinnati Bengals, but he did not see action on the field.

He split the 1974 NFL season between the St. Louis Cardinals (seven games played) and the Chicago Bears (one game played). The following season was his final one in the NFL, as he played in seven games with the Green Bay Packers.

Personal life
He is co-owner of ACV Water and has served as 1st Vice President of the National Football League Players Association Dallas, Texas Chapter. He has been an advisor at Mountain View College and currently serves as an instructor at the community college.

He has also been an instructor at Eastfield College in Mesquite, Texas and for the Houston Independent School District and the Dallas Independent School District.

References

Sportspeople from Amarillo, Texas
St. Louis Cardinals (football) players
Chicago Bears players
Green Bay Packers players
American football defensive backs
North Texas Mean Green football players
1950 births
Living people
Players of American football from Texas